Gustave Dumas (5 March 1872, L'Etivaz, Vaud, Switzerland – 11 July 1955) was a Swiss mathematician, specializing in algebraic geometry.

Dumas received a baccalaureate degree from the University of Lausanne, then another baccalaureate degree from the Sorbonne, and in 1904 a doctoral degree from the Sorbonne with dissertation Sur les fonctions à caractère algébrique dans le voisinage d'un point donné. In 1906 he obtained his habilitation qualification from Zürich's Federal Polytechnic School with habilitation dissertation Sur quelques cas d'irréductibilité des polynômes à coefficients rationnels. From 1906 to 1913 Dumas taught higher mathematics at the Federal Polytechnic School. At the University of Lausanne's Engineering School, he became in 1913 a professor extraordinarius and in 1916 a professor ordinarius, retiring in 1942. At Lausanne he had an important influence on his student Georges de Rham, who became Dumas's assistant before graduating in 1925.

Dumas served a two-year term as president of the Swiss Mathematical Society in 1922–1923. He was an Invited Speaker of the International Congress of Mathematicians in 1928 at Bologna.

Selected publications
"Sur quelques cas d'irréductibilité des polynômes à coefficients rationnels." Journal de Mathématiques Pures et Appliquées 2 (1906): 191–258.
"Sur la résolution des singularités des surfaces." CR Acad. Sci. Paris 152 (1911): 682–684.
"Sur le polygone de Newton et les courbes algébriques planes." Commentarii Mathematici Helvetici 1, no. 1 (1929): 120–141.

References

1872 births
1955 deaths
Swiss mathematicians
University of Lausanne alumni
University of Paris alumni
Academic staff of the University of Lausanne
Swiss expatriates in France